There are over 20,000 Grade II* listed buildings in England. This page is a list of these buildings in the district of Peterborough in Cambridgeshire.

List

|}

Notes

External links

 
Lists of Grade II* listed buildings in Cambridgeshire
Grade II